Magic Hunter is a 1994 Hungarian-Swiss-French fantasy film  written and directed by Ildikó Enyedi and loosely inspired to the opera Der Freischütz.

The film was entered into the main competition at the 51st edition of the Venice Film Festival.

Plot

Cast 
  
 Gary Kemp as Max
 Sadie Frost as Eva
 Alexander Kaidanovsky as Maxim
 Péter Vallai as Kaspar
 Mathias Gnädinger as Police Chief
 Alexandra Wasscher as Lili
 Ildikó Tóth as Lina
 Natalie Conde as Virgin Mary
 Zoltán Gera as Shoemaker
 Philippe Duclos as Monk
 Andor Lukáts as One-Eyed Monk

Reception
Film critic Stephen Holden described it as "an unwieldy stylistic hybrid of narrative film making and arty montage" and as "klutzy and vague in its symbolic connections".  Deseret News' critic Jeff Vice noted that "Enyedi has an interesting visual style, but she's too busy to concentrate on the storyline". According to Barbara Shulgasser, "Enyedi's visuals, shot by Tibor Mathe, are often beautiful enough to distract you from narrative failings".

References

External links

1995 fantasy films
English-language Hungarian films
Films directed by Ildikó Enyedi
Hungarian fantasy films
Films based on operas
1990s English-language films